Mahima Chaudhry is an Indian actress and model who worked in Hindi films. During the 1990s, Chaudhry did a few modelling assignments and appeared in several television commercials before venturing into films. She made her acting debut in the 1997 film Pardes, for which she won the Filmfare Award for Best Female Debut. She established a career with several roles in films including Daag (1999), Dhadkan (2000), Kurukshetra (2000), Baghban (2003), and received critical recognition for her performances in Dil Kya Kare (1999), Lajja (2001) and Dobara (2004)

Early and personal life
Mahima Chaudhry was born in Darjeeling, West Bengal, India. She attended Dow Hill in Kurseong until class 10 and later moved to Loreto College, Darjeeling. 

She married architect Bobby Mukherji in 2006. The couple separated in 2013.

Chaudhry was diagnosed and treated in 2022 for breast cancer.

Acting career
Chaudhry has played a variety of roles, starting with a village girl in Pardes (1997). Her other roles were in Daag: The Fire (1999), where she played a dual role; in Pyaar Koi Khel Nahin (1999) she played a widow forced to marry her brother-in-law; in Dhadkan (2000) she is a loving friend of a man who is madly in love with another woman: in Deewane she plays a singer in love with a thief: in Kurukshetra she plays the stubborn wife of a police officer: in Lajja she plays a young bride forced to fight dowry; in Yeh Teraa Ghar Yeh Meraa Ghar (2001) she plays a stubborn tenant who will not give up her home at any cost; in Om Jai Jagadish she is the loving homemaker; in Dil Hai Tumhaara (2002) she is the sister who would do anything for her sister's happiness; in Dobara she is the frustrated housewife; in The Film she is a desperate struggling screenwriter; in Zameer: The Fire Within she's a paralytic dancer, in Film Star she is an uptight arrogant fading actress; in Home Delivery (2005) she's a South Indian superstar; and in Souten: The Other Woman (2006) she plays a desperate housewife who has an affair with her stepdaughter's boyfriend.

In 2010, Chaudhry starred in a Knightsbridge Media Production film, Pusher, directed by Assad Raja. She also worked in the thriller Mumbhaii - The Gangster, co-starring Om Puri and Sanjay Kapoor.

Filmography

TV shows
 Ticket to Bollywood (judge) (NDTV Prime)

Awards and nominations

See also
 List of Indian film actresses

References

External links

 
 

Indian film actresses
Female models from West Bengal
Living people
People from Darjeeling
Year of birth missing (living people)
Actresses from West Bengal
Actresses in Hindi cinema
Actresses in Hindi television
20th-century Indian actresses
21st-century Indian actresses
Filmfare Awards winners
Zee Cine Awards winners